John Lackner Ducker (September 3, 1922 – April 15, 2014) was an American politician in the state of Florida. He was an attorney by profession.

Ducker was born in Fort Thomas, Kentucky. He attended Yale University and Yale Law School, attaining his law degree in 1950. He served in the Florida House of Representatives from 1960 to 1968.
He was elected to the State Senate in 1968, serving until 1971.

Ducker was a member of Phi Beta Kappa. He was also active in the Young Republicans Club, American Legion, Bar Association of Florida, Sportsmen Association, Chamber of Commerce, Episcopal Church and Boy Scouts. Ducker served in the United States Army's Signal Corps as a second lieutenant during World War II. He died in 2014 at the age of 91.

References

2014 deaths
1922 births
Republican Party members of the Florida House of Representatives
People from Fort Thomas, Kentucky
Yale Law School alumni
United States Army personnel of World War II
Florida lawyers
United States Army officers
Republican Party Florida state senators
20th-century American lawyers
20th-century American politicians